Uttara South metro station (romanised: Uttora dokk(sh)hin metro steshen) is a metro station of the Dhaka Metro's MRT Line 6. This station is located in Uttara, a suburb of Dhaka. It is estimated that the station will be opened on the last week of March 2023.

History
The Uttara South Metro Station was constructed under "Package CP-03". The notification of application for construction of raised bridges for stations and railways was published on 30 June 2015 and the last date for submission of applications was 9 September 2015. Italian-Thai Development Public Company Limited gets work contract for "Package CP-03". The agreement was sent on 29 March 2016 for NBR investigation and law and parliamentary investigation. The signing ceremony for the agreement package was held on 3 May 2017 at the Pan Pacific Sonargaon Hotel in Dhaka. Construction work started on 2 August 2017.

Station

Station layout

References

Metro stations in Uttara
Railway stations opened in 2023
2023 establishments in Bangladesh